The Natural Earth projection is a pseudocylindrical map projection designed by Tom Patterson and introduced in 2012. It is neither conformal nor equal-area, but a compromise between the two.

It was designed in Flex Projector, a specialized software application that offers a graphical approach for the creation of new projections.

Definition
The natural Earth is defined by the following formulas:

 ,

where
  is the longitude from the central meridian in radians;
 is the latitude in radians; 
  is the length of the parallel at latitude ;
  is the distance of the parallel from the equator at latitude .

In the original definition of the projection, planar coordinates were lineally interpolated from a table of 19 latitudes and then multiplied by other factors. The authors of the projection later provided a polynomial representation that closely matches the original but improves smoothness at the "corners".

See also
 Robinson projection
 Winkel tripel projection
 Kavrayskiy VII
 Equal Earth projection

References

Map projections
Cartography